Eukoenenia is a genus of Eukoeneniid microwhip scorpions, first described by Carl Julius Bernhard Börner in 1901.

Species 
, the World Palpigradi Catalog accepts the following eighty-four species:

 Eukoenenia amatei Mayoral & Barranco, 2017 – Spain
 Eukoenenia angolensis (Rémy, 1956) – Angola
 Eukoenenia angusta (Hansen, 1901) – India, Sri Lanka, Thailand
 Eukoenenia ankaratrensis Rémy, 1960 – Madagascar
 Eukoenenia antanosa (Rémy, 1950) – Madagascar
 Eukoenenia audax Souza, Mayoral & Ferreira, 2020 – Brazil
 Eukoenenia austriaca (Hansen, 1926) – Austria, Italy, Slovenia
 Eukoenenia bara (Rémy, 1950) – Madagascar
 Eukoenenia berlesei (Silvestri, 1903) – Algeria, France, Italy, U.S. Virgin Islands
 Eukoenenia bonadonai Condé, 1979 – France, Italy
 Eukoenenia bouilloni Condé, 1980 – France
 Eukoenenia brignolii Condé, 1979 – Italy
 Eukoenenia brolemanni (Hansen, 1926) – France
 Eukoenenia chartoni (Rémy, 1950) – Madagascar, Sri Lanka
 Eukoenenia chilanga Montaño, 2012 – Mexico
 Eukoenenia christiani Condé, 1988 – Malta
 Eukoenenia condei Orghidan, Georgesco & Sârbu, 1982 – Romania
 Eukoenenia corozalensis Montaño & Francke, 2006 – Mexico
 Eukoenenia deceptrix Rémy, 1960 – Madagascar
 Eukoenenia deleta Condé, 1992 – Thailand
 Eukoenenia delphini (Rémy, 1950) – Madagascar
 Eukoenenia depilata Rémy, 1960 – Madagascar
 Eukoenenia draco (Peyerimhoff, 1906) – Spain
 Eukoenenia ferratilis Souza & Ferreira, 2011 – Brazil
 Eukoenenia florenciae (Rucker, 1903) – Argentina, Australia, Colombia, France, Nepal, Paraguay, US
 Eukoenenia fossati Rémy, 1960 – Madagascar
 Eukoenenia gadorensis Mayoral & Barranco, 2002 – Spain
 Eukoenenia gasparoi Condé, 1988 – Croatia, Italy, Slovenia
 Eukoenenia grafittii Condé & Heurtault, 1994 – Italy
 Eukoenenia grassii (Hansen, 1901) – Chile, Paraguay
 Eukoenenia guzikae Barranco & Harvey, 2008 – Australia
 Eukoenenia hanseni (Silvestri, 1913) – Argentina, Bermuda, Colombia, Egypt, Madagascar, Mauritius, Mexico, Morocco, Nepal, Réunion, US
 Eukoenenia hesperia (Rémy, 1953) – Côte d’Ivoire
 Eukoenenia hispanica (Peyerimhoff, 1908) – Spain
 Eukoenenia igrejinha Souza & Ferreira, 2019 – Brazil
 Eukoenenia improvisa Condé, 1979 – French Guiana
 Eukoenenia indalica Mayoral & Barranco, 2017 – Spain
 Eukoenenia janetscheki Condé, 1993 – Brazil
 Eukoenenia jequitai Souza & Ferreira, 2020 – Brazil
 Eukoenenia juberthiei Condé, 1974 – Greece, Lebanon
 Eukoenenia kenyana Condé, 1979 – Kenya
 Eukoenenia lanai Christian, 2014 – Italy
 Eukoenenia lauteli (Rémy, 1950) – Madagascar
 Eukoenenia lawrencei Rémy, 1957 – Papua New Guinea, South Africa
 Eukoenenia lienhardi Condé, 1989 – Brunei, Indonesia, Singapore
 Eukoenenia lundi Souza & Ferreira, 2020 – Brazil
 Eukoenenia lyrifer Condé, 1992 – Thailand
 Eukoenenia machadoi (Rémy, 1950) – Angola
 Eukoenenia madeirae Strinati & Condé, 1995 – Portugal
 Eukoenenia magna Souza & Ferreira, 2020 – Brazil
 Eukoenenia maquinensis Souza & Ferreira, 2010 – Brazil
 Eukoenenia margaretae Orghidan, Georgesco & Sârbu, 1982 – Romania
 Eukoenenia maroccana Barranco & Mayoral, 2007 – Morocco
 Eukoenenia maros Condé, 1992 – Indonesia
 Eukoenenia meridiana Rémy, 1960 – Madagascar
 Eukoenenia mirabilis (Grassi & Calandruccio, 1885) – Southern Europe, North Africa, Australia, Chile, Israel, Madagascar
 Eukoenenia montagudi Barranco & Mayoral, 2014 – Spain
 Eukoenenia naxos Condé, 1990 – Greece
 Eukoenenia necessaria Rémy, 1960 – Madagascar
 Eukoenenia orghidani Condé & Juberthie, 1981 – Cuba
 Eukoenenia patrizii (Condé, 1956) – Italy
 Eukoenenia pauli Condé, 1979 – Gabon
 Eukoenenia paulinae Condé, 1994 – Indonesia
 Eukoenenia potiguar Ferreira, Souza, Machado & Brescovit, 2011 – Brazil
 Eukoenenia pretneri Condé, 1977 – Croatia
 Eukoenenia pyrenaella Condé, 1990 – France
 Eukoenenia pyrenaica (Hansen, 1926) – France
 Eukoenenia remyi Condé, 1974 – Bosnia
 Eukoenenia roquettei (Mello-Leitão & Arlé, 1935) – Brazil
 Eukoenenia roscia Christian, 2014 – Italy
 Eukoenenia sakalava (Rémy, 1950) – Madagascar
 Eukoenenia sendrai Barranco & Mayoral, 2014 – Spain
 Eukoenenia siamensis (Hansen, 1901) – Thailand
 Eukoenenia singhi Condé, 1989 – India
 Eukoenenia spelaea (Peyerimhoff, 1902) – Austria, Croatia, France, Hungary, Italy, Slovakia
 Eukoenenia spelunca Souza & Ferreira, 2011 – Brazil
 Eukoenenia strinatii Condé, 1977 – Italy
 Eukoenenia subangusta (Silvestri, 1903) – Italy, Romania
 Eukoenenia tetraplumata Montaño, 2007 – Mexico
 Eukoenenia thais Condé, 1988 – Thailand
 Eukoenenia trehai Rémy, 1960 – Madagascar
 Eukoenenia valencianus Barranco & Mayoral, 2014 – Spain
 Eukoenenia vargovitshi Christian, 2014 – Georgia
 Eukoenenia zariquieyi (Condé, 1951) – Spain

References 

Palpigradi